Šola is a surname found in Croatia and Bosnia and Herzegovina.

Notable people with the name include:

 Antonija Šola (born 1979), Croatian musician and actress
 Ivan Šola (born 1961), Croatian bobsledder and racer
 Ivica Šola (born 1968), Croatian theologian and communication scientist
 John Sola (born 1944), Canadian politician of Croatian origin
 Tomislav Šola (born 1948), Croatian museologist
 Vlado Šola (born 1968), Croatian handball coach and player
 Vojislav Šola (1863–1921), Bosnian Serb activist and politician

Croatian surnames